The EF28–80mm f/3.5–5.6 is a zoom lens produced by Canon Inc. for their series of EOS single-lens reflex cameras. Canon produced eight iterations of the lens from 1989 to 1999.

The other 28–80mm lens is the EF28–80mm f/2.8–4L USM, which was an EF mount wide-to-normal zoom lens introduced by Canon in April 1989. Being of the "L" class, it is of completely different design and structure than the aforementioned 28–80mm 3.5–5.6 lens. This lens was replaced by the EF28-70mm f/2.8L USM.

Description

The 'L' lens is identified by a red stripe around the lens barrel. It is a totally separate classification of lens, much larger and up to three times heavier, sharing very little if any features with the non-L versions. The L version is considerably faster, with an aperture range of f/2.8–4.0 (as opposed to f/3.5–5.6). Unlike newer L-series lenses, it is not a constant aperture lens; the maximum aperture of this lens varied with the zoom (f/2.8 @ 28 mm, f/4.0 @ 80 mm). It uses a ring USM, and as several early professional USM lenses, manual focus is performed with a "focus by wire" arrangement. The manual focus ring is a digital input that directs the lens computer to adjust focus using the autofocus motor. This was done to allow full-time manual focus with the relatively new ultrasonic motors. This lens predates the lower cost, non-L versions and production of this version ended in approximately 1996.

The first iteration of the f/3.5–5.6 ("USM" in the chart below) non-L lens is identified by the metal mount and distance scale. The initial USM version, while much smaller and lighter in weight than the L version, is considerably larger and heavier than later versions due to the internal optics and the use of larger but quieter and faster ring motor USM. Production of the first version ended in (approximately) 1995. This lens is unique in the 28–80 mm f/3.5–5.6 series.

USM versions II through V deleted the DoF window and are considerably lighter in weight and smaller in diameter. They retain the USM feature albeit with a lower-cost, slower but more compact micro-motor version. They share more in appearance with their non-USM siblings, as the body shape and weight are more like the non-USM than the first USM version. The USM II through V versions also incorporate a plastic lens mount.

Only the L and original USM lenses support full-time manual focusing (FTM), which allows the user to override autofocus simply by turning the focus ring. The USM versions II through V do not.

Even lower cost non-USM versions ("Original" and "II" in the chart below) were produced as well. Like the USM II-V versions, these non-USM versions have a plastic mount and no distance or depth of field scales.

Table

External links

At the Canon Camera Museum website:
EF28-80mm f/3.5-5.6 USM
EF28-80mm f/3.5-5.6 II USM
EF28-80mm f/3.5-5.6 III USM
EF28-80mm f/3.5-5.6 IV USM
EF28-80mm f/3.5-5.6 V USM
EF28-80mm f/3.5-5.6
EF28-80mm f/3.5-5.6 II

28-80mm lens
Canon L-Series lenses